A malaria vaccine is a vaccine that is used to prevent malaria. The only approved malaria vaccine is RTS,S, known by the brand name Mosquirix. , the vaccine has been given to 1million children living in areas with moderate-to-high malaria transmission. It requires at least three doses in infants by age 2, with a fourth dose extending the protection for another 1-2 years. The vaccine reduces hospital admissions from severe malaria by around 30%.

Research continues with other malaria vaccines. The most effective malaria vaccine is R21/Matrix-M, with a 77% efficacy rate shown in initial trials and significantly higher antibody levels than with the RTS,S vaccine. It is the first vaccine that meets the World Health Organization's (WHO) goal of a malaria vaccine with at least 75% efficacy.

Approved vaccines

RTS,S

RTS,S/AS01 (commercial name Mosquirix) is the only malaria vaccine approved and in wide use. It requires at least three doses in infants by age 2, with a fourth dose extending the protection for another 1-2 years. The vaccine reduces hospital admissions from severe malaria by around 30%.

RTS,S was developed by PATH Malaria Vaccine Initiative (MVI) and GlaxoSmithKline (GSK) with support from the Bill and Melinda Gates Foundation. It is a recombinant vaccine, consisting of the P. falciparum circumsporozoite protein (CSP) from the pre-erythrocytic stage. The CSP antigen causes the production of antibodies capable of preventing the invasion of hepatocytes and additionally elicits a cellular response enabling the destruction of infected hepatocytes. The CSP vaccine presented problems in the trial stage due to its poor immunogenicity. RTS,S attempted to avoid these by fusing the protein with a surface antigen from hepatitis B, creating a more potent and immunogenic vaccine. When tested in trials an emulsion of oil in water and the added adjuvants of monophosphoryl A and QS21 (SBAS2), the vaccine gave protective immunity to 7 out of 8 volunteers when challenged with P. falciparum.

RTS,S was engineered using genes from the outer protein of P. falciparum malaria parasite and a portion of a hepatitis B virus plus a chemical adjuvant to boost the immune response. Infection is prevented by inducing high antibody titers that block the parasite from infecting the liver. In November 2012, a Phase III trial of RTS,S found that it provided modest protection against both clinical and severe malaria in young infants.

In October 2013, preliminary results of a phase III clinical trial indicated that RTS,S/AS01 reduced the number of cases among young children by almost 50 percent and among infants by around 25 percent. The study ended in 2014. The effects of a booster dose were positive, even though overall efficacy seems to wane with time. After four years, reductions were 36 percent for children who received three shots and a booster dose. Missing the booster dose reduced the efficacy against severe malaria to a negligible effect. The vaccine was shown to be less effective for infants. Three doses of vaccine plus a booster reduced the risk of clinical episodes by 26 percent over three years but offered no significant protection against severe malaria.

In a bid to accommodate a larger group and guarantee a sustained availability for the general public, GSK applied for a marketing license with the European Medicines Agency (EMA) in July 2014. GSK treated the project as a non-profit initiative, with most funding coming from the Gates Foundation, a major contributor to malaria eradication.

In July 2015, Mosquirix received a positive scientific opinion from the European Medicines Agency (EMA) on the proposal for the vaccine to be used to vaccinate children aged 6 weeks to 17 months outside the European Union. A pilot project for vaccination was launched on 23 April 2019 in Malawi, on 30 April 2019 in Ghana, and on 13 September 2019 in Kenya.

In October 2021, the vaccine was endorsed by the World Health Organization for "broad use" in children, making it the first malaria vaccine to receive this recommendation. , 1million children in Ghana, Kenya and Malawi have received at least one shot of the vaccine.

In August 2022, UNICEF awarded a contract to GSK to purchase 18million doses of the RTS,S vaccine over three years. More than 30 countries have areas with moderate to high malaria transmission where the vaccine is expected to be useful.

Agents under development
A completely effective vaccine is not available for malaria, although several vaccines are under development. Multiple vaccine candidates targeting the blood-stage of the parasite's life cycle have been insufficient on their own. Several potential vaccines targeting the pre-erythrocytic stage are being developed, with RTS,S the only approved option so far.

R21/Matrix-M 
The most effective malaria vaccine is R21/Matrix-M, with 77% efficacy shown in initial trials. It is the first vaccine that meets the World Health Organization's goal of a malaria vaccine with at least 75% efficacy. It was developed through a collaboration involving the University of Oxford, the Kenya Medical Research Institute, the London School of Hygiene & Tropical Medicine, Novavax, the Serum Institute of India. The trials took place at the Institut de Recherche en Sciences de la Santé in Nanoro, Burkina Faso with Halidou Tinto as the principal investigator. The R21 vaccine uses a circumsporozoite protein (CSP) antigen, at a higher proportion than the RTS,S vaccine. It includes the Matrix-M adjuvant that is also utilized in the Novavax COVID-19 vaccine.

A phase II trial was reported in April 2021, with a vaccine efficacy of 77% and antibody levels significantly higher than with the RTS,S vaccine. A booster shot of R21/Matrix-M that is given 12 months after the primary three-dose regimen maintains a high efficacy against malaria, providing high protection against symptomatic malaria for at least 2 years. A phase III trial with 4,800 children across four African countries was reported in November 2022, demonstrating vaccine efficacy of 74% against a severe malaria episode. Further data from multiple studies is being collected, with the possibility of vaccine approval for wide use in the first half of 2023.

Nanoparticle enhancement of RTS,S 
In 2015, researchers used a repetitive antigen display technology to engineer a nanoparticle that displayed malaria specific B cell and T cell epitopes. The particle exhibited icosahedral symmetry and carried on its surface up to 60 copies of the RTS,S protein. The researchers claimed that the density of the protein was much higher than the 14% of the GSK vaccine.

PfSPZ vaccine

The PfSPZ vaccine is a candidate malaria vaccine developed by Sanaria using radiation-attenuated sporozoites to elicit an immune response. Clinical trials have been promising, with trials in Africa, Europe, and the US protecting over 80% of volunteers. It has been subject to some criticism regarding the ultimate feasibility of large-scale production and delivery in Africa, since it must be stored in liquid nitrogen.

The PfSPZ vaccine candidate was granted fast track designation by the U.S. Food and Drug Administration in September 2016.

In April 2019, a phase III trial in Bioko was announced, scheduled to start in early 2020.

Other developments 
 SPf66 is a synthetic peptide based vaccine developed by the Manuel Elkin Patarroyo team in Colombia, and was tested extensively in endemic areas in the 1990s. Clinical trials showed it to be insufficiently effective, with 28% efficacy in South America and minimal or no efficacy in Africa. This vaccine had no protective effect in the largest placebo controlled randomized trial in South East Asia and was abandoned.
 The CSP (Circum-Sporozoite Protein) was a vaccine developed that initially appeared promising enough to undergo trials. It is also based on the circumsporozoite protein, but additionally has the recombinant (Asn-Ala-Pro15Asn-Val-Asp-Pro)2-Leu-Arg(R32LR) protein covalently bound to a purified Pseudomonas aeruginosa toxin (A9). However, at an early stage, a complete lack of protective immunity was demonstrated in those inoculated. The study group used in Kenya had an 82% incidence of parasitaemia while the control group only had an 89% incidence. The vaccine intended to cause an increased T-lymphocyte response in those exposed; this was also not observed. 
 The NYVAC-Pf7 multi-stage vaccine attempted to use different technology, incorporating seven P. falciparum antigenic genes. These came from a variety of stages during the life cycle. CSP and sporozoite surface protein 2 (called PfSSP2) were derived from the sporozoite phase. The liver stage antigen 1 (LSA1), three from the erythrocytic stage (merozoite surface protein 1, serine repeat antigen, and AMA-1), and one sexual stage antigen (the 25-kDa Pfs25) were included. This was first investigated using rhesus monkeys and produced encouraging results: 4 out of the 7 antigens produced specific antibody responses (CSP, PfSSP2, MSP1 and PFs25). Later trials in humans, despite demonstrating cellular immune responses in over 90% of the subjects, had very poor antibody responses. Despite this following administration of the vaccine, some candidates had complete protection when challenged with P. falciparum. This result has warranted ongoing trials. 
 In 1995 a field trial involving [NANP]19-5.1 proved to be very successful. Out of 194 children vaccinated, none developed symptomatic malaria in the 12-week follow-up period, and only 8 failed to have higher levels of antibody present. The vaccine consists of the schizont export protein (5.1) and 19 repeats of the sporozoite surface protein [NANP]. Limitations of the technology exist as it contains only 20% peptide and has low levels of immunogenicity. It also does not contain any immunodominant T-cell epitopes.
 A chemical compound undergoing trials for the treatment of tuberculosis and cancer—the JmJc inhibitor ML324 and the antitubercular clinical candidate SQ109—is potentially a new line of drugs to treat malaria and kill the parasite in its infectious stage. More tests still need to be carried out before the compounds would be approved as a viable treatment.

Considerations
The task of developing a preventive vaccine for malaria is a complex process. There are a number of considerations to be made concerning what strategy a potential vaccine should adopt.

Parasite diversity

P. falciparum has demonstrated the capability, through the development of multiple drug-resistant parasites, for evolutionary change. The Plasmodium species has a very high rate of replication, much higher than that actually needed to ensure transmission in the parasite's life cycle. This enables pharmaceutical treatments that are effective at reducing the reproduction rate, but not halting it, to exert a high selection pressure, thus favoring the development of resistance. The process of evolutionary change is one of the key considerations necessary when considering potential vaccine candidates. The development of resistance could cause a significant reduction in efficacy of any potential vaccine thus rendering useless a carefully developed and effective treatment.

Choosing to address the symptom or the source

The parasite induces two main response types from the human immune system.  These are anti-parasitic immunity and anti-toxic immunity.
 "Anti-parasitic immunity" addresses the source; it consists of an antibody response (humoral immunity) and a cell-mediated immune response. Ideally, a vaccine would enable the development of anti-plasmodial antibodies in addition to generating an elevated cell-mediated response.  Potential antigens against which a vaccine could be targeted will be discussed in greater depth later. Antibodies are part of the specific immune response. They exert their effect by activating the complement cascade, stimulating phagocytic cells into endocytosis through adhesion to an external surface of the antigenic substances, thus 'marking' it as offensive.  Humoral or cell-mediated immunity consists of many interlinking mechanisms that essentially aim to prevent infection entering the body (through external barriers or hostile internal environments) and then kill any micro-organisms or foreign particles that succeed in penetration. The cell-mediated component consists of many white blood cells (such as monocytes, neutrophils, macrophages, lymphocytes, basophils, mast cells, natural killer cells, and eosinophils) that target foreign bodies by a variety of different mechanisms. In the case of malaria, both systems would be targeted to attempt to increase the potential response generated, thus ensuring the maximum chance of preventing disease. 
 "Anti-toxic immunity" addresses the symptoms; it refers to the suppression of the immune response associated with the production of factors that either induce symptoms or reduce the effect that any toxic by-products (of micro-organism presence) have on the development of disease. For example, it has been shown that tumor necrosis factor-alpha has a central role in generating the symptoms experienced in severe P. falciparum malaria. Thus a therapeutic vaccine could target the production of TNF-a, preventing respiratory distress and cerebral symptoms. This approach has serious limitations as it would not reduce the parasitic load; rather, it only reduces the associated pathology.  As a result, there are substantial difficulties in evaluating efficacy in human trials.

Taking this information into consideration an ideal vaccine candidate would attempt to generate a more substantial cell-mediated and antibody response on parasite presentation. This would have the benefit of increasing the rate of parasite clearance, thus reducing the experienced symptoms and providing a level  of consistent future immunity against the parasite.

Potential targets

By their very nature, protozoa are more complex organisms than bacteria and viruses, with more complicated structures and life cycles. This presents problems in vaccine development but also increases the number of potential targets for a vaccine. These have been summarised into the life cycle stage and the antibodies that could potentially elicit an immune response.

The epidemiology of malaria varies enormously across the globe and has led to the belief that it may be necessary to adopt very different vaccine development strategies to target the different populations. A Type 1 vaccine is suggested for those exposed mostly to P. falciparum malaria in sub-Saharan Africa, with the primary objective to reduce the number of severe malaria cases and deaths in infants and children exposed to high transmission rates. The Type 2 vaccine could be thought of as a 'travelers' vaccine,' aiming to prevent all clinical symptoms in individuals with no previous exposure. This is another major public health problem, with malaria presenting as one of the most substantial threats to travelers' health. Problems with the available pharmaceutical therapies include costs, availability, adverse effects and contraindications, inconvenience, and compliance, many of which would be reduced or eliminated if an effective (greater than 85–90%) vaccine was developed. 

The life cycle of the malaria parasite is particularly complex, presenting initial developmental problems. Despite the huge number of vaccines available, there are none that target parasitic infections. The distinct developmental stages involved in the life cycle present numerous opportunities for targeting antigens, thus potentially eliciting an immune response.  Theoretically, each developmental stage could have a vaccine developed specifically to target the parasite. Moreover, any vaccine produced would ideally have the ability to be of therapeutic value as well as preventing further transmission and is likely to consist of a combination of antigens from different phases of the parasite's development.  More than 30 of these antigens are being researched by teams all over the world in the hope of identifying a combination that can elicit immunity in the inoculated individual. Some of the approaches involve surface expression of the antigen, inhibitory effects of specific antibodies on the life cycle and the protective effects through immunization or passive transfer of antibodies between an immune and a non-immune host. The majority of research into malarial vaccines has focused on the Plasmodium falciparum strain due to the high mortality caused by the parasite and the ease of carrying out in vitro/in vivo studies. The earliest vaccines attempted to use the parasitic circumsporozoite protein (CSP). This is the most dominant surface antigen of the initial pre-erythrocytic phase. However, problems were encountered due to low efficacy, reactogenicity and low immunogenicity. 
 The initial stage in the life cycle, following inoculation, is a relatively short "pre-erythrocytic" or "hepatic" phase. A vaccine at this stage must have the ability to protect against sporozoites invading and possibly inhibiting the development of parasites in the hepatocytes (through inducing cytotoxic T-lymphocytes that can destroy the infected liver cells). However, if any sporozoites evaded the immune system they would then have the potential to be symptomatic and cause the clinical disease.
 The second phase of the life cycle is the "erythrocytic" or blood phase. A vaccine here could prevent merozoite multiplication or the invasion of red blood cells. This approach is complicated by the lack of MHC molecule expression on the surface of erythrocytes. Instead, malarial antigens are expressed, and it is this towards which the antibodies could potentially be directed. Another approach would be to attempt to block the process of erythrocyte adherence to blood vessel walls. It is thought that this process is accountable for much of the clinical syndrome associated with malarial infection; therefore, a vaccine given during this stage would be therapeutic and hence administered during clinical episodes to prevent further deterioration.
 The last phase of the life cycle that has the potential to be targeted by a vaccine is the "sexual stage". This would not give any protective benefits to the individual inoculated but would prevent further transmission of the parasite by preventing the gametocytes from producing multiple sporozoites in the gut wall of the mosquito. It therefore would be used as part of a policy directed at eliminating the parasite from areas of low prevalence or to prevent the development and spread of vaccine-resistant parasites. This type of transmission-blocking vaccine is potentially very important. The evolution of resistance in the malaria parasite occurs very quickly, potentially making any vaccine redundant within a few generations. This approach to the prevention of spread is therefore essential.
 Another approach is to target the protein kinases, which are present during the entire lifecycle of the malaria parasite. Research is underway on this, yet production of an actual vaccine targeting these protein kinases may still take a long time.
 Report of a vaccine candidate capable of neutralizing all tested strains of Plasmodium falciparum, the most deadly form of the parasite causing malaria, was published in Nature Communications by a team of scientists from the University of Oxford in 2011.  The viral vector vaccine, targeting a full-length P. falciparum reticulocyte-binding protein homologue 5 (PfRH5) was found to induce an antibody response in an animal model.  The results of this new vaccine confirmed the utility of a key discovery reported from scientists at the Wellcome Trust Sanger Institute, published in Nature.   The earlier publication reported P. falciparum relies on a red blood cell surface receptor, known as 'basigin', to invade the cells by binding a protein PfRH5 to the receptor.  Unlike other antigens of the malaria parasite which are often genetically diverse, the PfRH5 antigen appears to have little genetic diversity.  It was found to induce very low antibody response in people naturally exposed to the parasite.   The high susceptibility of PfRH5 to the cross-strain neutralizing vaccine-induced antibody demonstrated a significant promise for preventing malaria in the long and often difficult road of vaccine development.  According to Professor Adrian Hill, a Wellcome Trust Senior Investigator at the University of Oxford, the next step would be the safety tests of this vaccine. At the time (2011) it was projected that if these proved successful, the clinical trials in patients could begin within two to three years.
 PfEMP1, one of the proteins known as variant surface antigens (VSAs) produced by Plasmodium falciparum, was found to be a key target of the immune system's response against the parasite.  Studies of blood samples from 296 mostly Kenyan children by researchers of Burnet Institute and their cooperators showed that antibodies against PfEMP1 provide protective immunity, while antibodies developed against other surface antigens do not.   Their results demonstrated that PfEMP1 could be a target to develop an effective vaccine which will reduce risk of developing malaria.
 Plasmodium vivax is the common malaria species found in India, Southeast Asia and South America.   It is able to stay dormant in the liver and reemerge years later to elicit new infections.  Two key proteins involved in the invasion of the red blood cells (RBC) by P. vivax are potential targets for drug or vaccine development.  When the Duffy binding protein (DBP) of P. vivax binds the Duffy antigen (DARC) on the surface of RBC, process for the parasite to enter the RBC is initiated.  Structures of the core region of DARC and the receptor binding pocket of DBP have been mapped by scientists at the Washington University in St. Louis.  The researchers found that the binding is a two-step process that involves two copies of the parasite protein acting together like a pair of tongs that "clamp" two copies of DARC.    Antibodies that interfere with the binding by either targeting the key region of the DARC or the DBP will prevent the infection.
 Antibodies against the Schizont Egress Antigen-1 (PfSEA-1) were found to disable the parasite's ability to rupture from the infected red blood cells (RBCs), thus preventing it from continuing with its life cycle.  Researchers from Rhode Island Hospital identified Plasmodium falciparum PfSEA-1, a 244 kd malaria antigen expressed in the schizont-infected RBCs.  Mice vaccinated with the recombinant PfSEA-1 produced antibodies which interrupted the schizont rupture from the RBCs and decreased the parasite replication.  The vaccine protected the mice from the lethal challenge of the parasite.  Tanzanian and Kenyan children who have antibodies to PfSEA-1 were found to have fewer parasites in their bloodstream and a milder case of malaria.  By blocking the schizont outlet, the PfSEA-1 vaccine may work synergistically with vaccines targeting the other stages of the malaria life cycle such as hepatocyte and RBC invasion.

Mix of antigenic components

Increasing the potential immunity generated against Plasmodia can be achieved by attempting to target multiple phases in the life cycle. This is additionally beneficial in reducing the possibility of resistant parasites developing. The use of multiple-parasite antigens can therefore have a synergistic or additive effect.

One of the most successful vaccine candidates in clinical trials consists of recombinant antigenic proteins to the circumsporozoite protein.

Delivery system

The selection of an appropriate system is fundamental in all vaccine development, but especially so in the case of malaria. A vaccine targeting several antigens may require delivery to different areas and by different means in order to elicit an effective response. Some adjuvants can direct the vaccine to the specifically targeted cell type—e.g., the use of Hepatitis B virus in the RTS,S vaccine to target infected hepatocytes—but in other cases, particularly when using combined antigenic vaccines, this approach is very complex. Some methods that have been attempted include the use of two vaccines, one directed at generating a blood response and the other a liver-stage response. These two vaccines could then be injected into two different sites, thus enabling the use of a more specific and potentially efficacious delivery system.

To increase, accelerate or modify the development of an immune response to a vaccine candidate, it is often necessary to combine the antigenic substance to be delivered with an adjuvant or specialised delivery system. These terms are often used interchangeably in relation to vaccine development; however in most cases a distinction can be made. An adjuvant is typically thought of as a substance used in combination with the antigen to produce a more substantial and robust immune response than that elicited by the antigen alone. This is achieved through three mechanisms: by affecting the antigen delivery and presentation, by inducing the production of immunomodulatory cytokines, and by affecting the antigen presenting cells (APC). Adjuvants can consist of many different materials, from cell microparticles to other particulate delivery systems (e.g. liposomes).

Adjuvants are crucial in affecting the specificity and isotype of the necessary antibodies. They are thought to be able to potentiate the link between the innate and adaptive immune responses. Due to the diverse nature of substances that can potentially have this effect on the immune system, it is difficult to classify adjuvants into specific groups. In most circumstances they consist of easily identifiable components of micro-organisms that are recognised by the innate immune system cells. The role of delivery systems is primarily to direct the chosen adjuvant and antigen into target cells to attempt to increase the efficacy of the vaccine further, therefore acting synergistically with the adjuvant.

There is increasing concern that the use of very potent adjuvants could precipitate autoimmune responses, making it imperative that the vaccine is focused on the target cells only. Specific delivery systems can reduce this risk by limiting the potential toxicity and systemic distribution of newly developed adjuvants.

Studies into the efficacy of malaria vaccines developed to date have illustrated that the presence of an adjuvant is key in determining any protection gained against malaria. A large number of natural and synthetic adjuvants have been identified throughout the history of vaccine development. Options identified thus far for use combined with a malaria vaccine include mycobacterial cell walls, liposomes, monophosphoryl lipid A and squalene.

History 

Individuals who are exposed to the parasite in endemic countries develop acquired immunity against disease and death. Such immunity does not, however prevent malarial infection; immune individuals often harbour asymptomatic parasites in their blood.  This does, however, imply that it is possible to create an immune response that protects against the harmful effects of the parasite.

Research shows that if immunoglobulin is taken from immune adults, purified, and then given to individuals who have no protective immunity, some protection can be gained.

Irradiated mosquitoes 
In 1967, it was reported that a level of immunity to the Plasmodium berghei parasite could be given to mice by exposing them to sporozoites that had been irradiated by x-rays. Subsequent human studies in the 1970s showed that humans could be immunized against Plasmodium vivax and Plasmodium falciparum by exposing them to the bites of significant numbers of irradiated mosquitos.

From 1989 to 1999, eleven volunteers recruited from the United States Public Health Service, United States Army, and United States Navy were immunized against Plasmodium falciparum by the bites of 1001–2927 mosquitoes that had been irradiated with 15,000 rads of gamma rays from a Co-60 or Cs-137 source.  This level of radiation is sufficient to attenuate the malaria parasites so that, while they can still enter hepatic cells, they cannot develop into schizonts nor infect red blood cells. Over a span of 42 weeks, 24 of 26 tests on the volunteers showed that they were protected from malaria.

References

Further reading 

 
 
 
 
 
 
 The Jordan Report

External links 
 
 Malaria Vaccine Initiative
 Malaria vaccines UK
 Gates Foundation Global Health: Malaria

Malaria
Protein subunit vaccines